Mundaragi is a municipal town in Gadag district in the Indian state of Karnataka. It is 99 kilometers from Gajendragad. Mundargi is also the taluka headquarter of the same name. Pin code of Mundaragi is 582118.

The name 'Mundaragi' is said to have been derived from the stone hill, located to north-west of the town, called Murudagiri - meaning 'Hill of Lord Shiva'.

Geography
It has a total area of 6.64 km2. Surrounded by the Kappatagiri range of hills, Mundargi has frequent droughts.

Demographics
 India census, the Mundargi Town Municipal Council (TMC) has a population of 24,919, of which 12,513 are males and 12,406 are females.

The population of children with age of 0 – 6 years is 3,215, which is 12.90% of the total population of Mundargi TMC. In the Mundargi TMC, the Female Sex Ratio is 991 against the state average of 973. The Child Sex Ratio in Mundargi is 886 compared to Karnataka state average of 948. Literacy rate of Mundargi city is 79.15%, higher than the state average of 75.36%. In Mundargi, male literacy is 86.82% while female literacy is 71.53%.

Schools and Colleges
Mundargi has many educational institutions:

Jawahar Navodaya Vidyalaya (JNV), (CBSE) located at Bennihalli, 5 km from Mundargi. 
 Adarsh Vidyalaya (RMSA) Mundargi located at korlahalli , 9 km from Mundargi .
Government P U College 
Govt. I T I College
Govt. First Grade College
J T Fort High School
J A Comp. P U College (aided P U College)
M S Dambal Women P U College (unaided P U College)
Lions Comp. P U College (unaided P U College)
S V S R M P U College (unaided P U College)
Shri S B S Ayurvedic Medical College (affiliated to Rajiv Gandhi University of Health Sciences, Bengaluru)
K R Bellad Arts and Commerce College (affiliated to Karnatak University, Dharwad)
S F S English Medium School
Shri Swami Vivekanand High School
Sri V G Limbikayi Higher primary School
Challenge public school mundargi

Transportation
The nearest railway stations are at Gadag and Koppal, and the nearest airport is at Hubballi.

History and Culture 
Mundargi town has a history of over 400 years. In 1857, during the Sepoy Mutiny, Bheemarao Nadagouda, a British official, rebelled against the British East India Company and stole a huge amount of money. He was killed near Koppal fort.

An ancient temple of Lord Narsimha, built by Rangarao Nadgauda in the early 18th Century, is located on the stone hill in Mundargi. Shri Kanaka Narsimha Jatre is held during Holi every year.

Mundargi is also famous for the Annadaneeshwara Matha. Annadaneeshwara was a Veerashaiva monk, known for his generosity and Annadaanam (food donation). A jatre in his name is celebrated in the months of January–February every year.

Places near Mundargi
Mundargi has many historically significant and religious places nearby. Dambal, located at a distance of 18 km, is home to Kalyani Chalukya archaeological remnants. A famous Veerabhadra Temple is in Singatalur, about 20 km away. Madalaghatta, about 12 km away and just across the Tungabhadra river, is home to a famous Hanuman Temple. The Kappata Hills range is a reserved forest and is home to diverse flora and fauna. Venkateshwara Temple at Ramenahalli is a temple to Lord Venkateshwara.

References

See also
Hammigi
Gadag
Venkateshwara Temple, Ramenahalli

Cities and towns in Gadag district
Forts in Karnataka